

Portugal
 Angola – António Sérgio de Sousa, Governor-General of Angola (1851–1853)

United Kingdom
 Bahamas – John Gregory, Governor of the Bahamas (1849–1854)
 Bermuda -
 Gold Coast - Stephen John Hill, Governor of the Gold Coast (1851-1854)
 Malta Colony – William Reid, Governor of Malta (1851–1858)
 New South Wales – Lieutenant Colonel Charles FitzRoy, Governor of New South Wales (1846–1855)
 South Australia – Sir Henry Fox Young, Governor of South Australia (1848–1854)
 Western Australia''' – Captain Charles Fitzgerald, Governor of Western Australia (1848–1855)

Colonial governors
Colonial governors
1852